Vasi or VASI may refer to:

Visual Approach Slope Indicator, a system of lights on the side of an airport runway threshold
Vasi-vari or Wasi-wari language, a language spoken by the Wasi people in the Prasun Valley in Afghanistan

Places
Vasi, Iran (disambiguation)

People with the surname
Abbas Vasi, Gujarati poet
Denise Vasi, actress and model
Giuseppe Vasi, Italian engraver and architect

See also
Vashi (disambiguation)

a